Come Back to Me may refer to:

Film and television 

 Come Back to Me or Doll Face, a 1945 American musical romantic comedy
 Come Back to Me (1944 film), a 1944 German film
 Come Back to Me (1959 film), a South Korean film featuring Kim Seung-ho
 Come Back to Me (2014 film), a 2014 American film based on the book The Resurrectionist by Wrath James White
 "Come Back to Me" (Desperate Housewives), an episode of Desperate Housewives

Music 
"Come Back to Me", written by Lerner and Lane for On a Clear Day You Can See Forever;  first performed by Louis Jourdan 1965, No.5 in Canada for Robert Goulet
 "Come Back to Me" (Janet Jackson song), 1989
 "Come Back to Me" (Indecent Obsession song), 1990
 "Come Back to Me" (Ayreon song), 2005
 "Come Back to Me" (Vanessa Hudgens song), 2006
 "Come Back to Me" (David Cook song), 2009
 "Come Back to Me" (Hikaru Utada song), 2009
 "Come Back to Me", a song by Uriah Heep on their album Fallen Angel, 1978
 "Come Back to Me", a song from the 1965 musical On a Clear Day You Can See Forever
 "Come Back to Me", a song by the Plain White T's from Every Second Counts